Jordan Doering (born 14 September 1979) is a former Australian rules footballer who played with Carlton in the Australian Football League. After being delisted by Carlton, Doering played in the Victorian Football League for the Tasmanian Devils and the Bendigo Bombers, before moving to Queensland to play for Labrador in the Queensland Australian Football League. In 2007 he joined Strathmore in the Essendon District Football League.

Sources
Holmesby, Russell & Main, Jim (2009). The Encyclopedia of AFL Footballers. 8th ed. Melbourne: Bas Publishing.

Jordan Doering's profile at Blueseum

Carlton Football Club players
Living people
1979 births
Australian rules footballers from Victoria (Australia)
Sandhurst Football Club players
Bendigo Pioneers players
Tasmanian Devils Football Club players
Bendigo Football Club players
Strathmore Football Club players
Labrador Australian Football Club players